A thumb index, also called a cut-in index or an index notch, is a round cut-out in the pages of dictionaries, encyclopedias, Bibles and other large religious books, and various sectioned, often alphabetic, reference works, used to locate entries starting at a particular letter or section. The individual notches are called thumb cuts.

Several ways to achieve this indexing effect were invented and patented in the 1970s by Arthur S. Friedman, a printing engineer in New York.

See also 
 Index (publishing)

References 

Index (publishing)
Book design